Glittering Days may refer to:

Glittering Days (TV series) (東方之珠), 2006 Hong Kong TV series
Glittering Days (film) (万家灯火), 2009 Chinese film
The Glittering Days (星光灿烂), 2010 Malaysian-Singaporean TV series